James Clancy may refer to:

 James Clancy (politician) (1844–1921), Ontario farmer, businessman and political figure
 James M. Clancy, warden of Sing Sing prison
 James T. Clancy (1833–1870), Union Army soldier and Medal of Honor recipient

See also
 Jim Clancy (disambiguation)